Batha is a village  in the Keserwan District of the Keserwan-Jbeil Governorate of Lebanon. It is located 28 kilometers northern the Lebanese capital Beirut, and to the east of Jounieh Bay, with a view of the Mediterranean sea, with average elevation of 580 meters above sea level and total land area approximately 63 hectares. A water spring flows through the pine and oak tree forests to the north of Batha, watering gardens and orchards before emptying in the Mediterranean sea.

The inhabitants of  the town are predominantly Maronite Catholics. Batha is the hometown of Lebanese painter Michel Elmir (1930–1973).

References

Populated places in Keserwan District
Maronite Christian communities in Lebanon